Pokharvindi is a village development committee in Rupandehi District in Lumbini Province of southern Nepal. At the time of the 1991 Nepal census it had a population of 3930.

References

Mr Romeo Rajkumar in
pokharvindi

Populated places in Rupandehi District